HD 100453 is a binary star system which lies in the constellation Centaurus about  away from the Sun and is a member of the open cluster Scorpius–Centaurus association.

Components 
The apparent magnitudes of the visible components A and B are 7.8 and 15.9 respectively.  The primary is a Herbig Ae/Be star, which is young but no longer accreting mass. The secondary is an M4 class red dwarf star at the projected separation 120 AU from the primary.

Circumstellar disks
The primary star is surrounded by two dust disks, separated by a gap. The disks are orbiting in different planes, misaligned by 72 degrees. The disk misalignment may be caused by a suspected superjovian planet orbiting within the gap, roughly 15–20 AU from the primary. The outer disk has a 2-arm spiral structure caused by the outer stellar companion HD 100453B.  The outer disk is rather massive at 0.0174, but is significantly depleted in gas, with a gas-to-dust mass ratio of no more than 4:1.

The gas present in the disks is unusually depleted in nitrogen and hydrogen-bearing compounds and enriched in carbon monoxide. Molecular hydrogen was not detected. Solid silicate material present in the disks shows good crystallinity, with reduced amounts of amorphous material.

No disks were detected around the companion star HD 100453B, with the upper limit on the amount of dust around it being .

References 

Herbig Ae/Be stars
Centaurus (constellation)
J11330559-5419285
CD-53 4102
056354
100453
Circumstellar disks
Binary stars
Hypothetical planetary systems
A-type main-sequence stars